Clifford Seth Stein (born December 14, 1965), a computer scientist, is a professor of industrial engineering and operations research at Columbia University in New York, NY, where he also holds an appointment in the Department of Computer Science. Stein is chair of the Industrial Engineering and Operations Research Department at Columbia University.  Prior to joining Columbia, Stein was a professor at Dartmouth College in New Hampshire.

Stein's research interests include the design and analysis of algorithms, combinatorial optimization, operations research, network algorithms, scheduling, algorithm engineering and computational biology.

Stein has published many influential papers in the leading conferences and journals in his fields of research, and has occupied a variety of editorial positions including in the journals ACM Transactions on Algorithms, Mathematical Programming, Journal of Algorithms, SIAM Journal on Discrete Mathematics and Operations Research Letters. His work has been funded by the National Science Foundation and the Sloan Foundation. As of November 1, 2015, his publications have been cited over 46,000 times, and he has an h-index of 42.

Stein is the winner of several prestigious awards including an NSF Career Award, an Alfred Sloan Research Fellowship and the Karen Wetterhahn Award for Distinguished Creative or Scholarly Achievement. He is also the co-author of two textbooks:  
 Introduction to Algorithms,  with T. Cormen, C. Leiserson and R. Rivest, which is currently the best-selling textbook in algorithms and has been translated into 8 languages. About 39,500 of Stein's 46,000 citations are made to this book.
 Discrete Mathematics for Computer Science, with Ken Bogart and Scot Drysdale, which is a new textbook that covers discrete math at an undergraduate level.

Stein earned his B.S.E. from Princeton University in 1987, a Master of Science from The Massachusetts Institute of Technology in 1989, and a PhD also from the Massachusetts Institute of Technology in 1992.

In recent years, Stein has built up close ties with the Norwegian research community which earned him an honorary doctorate from the University of Oslo (May 2010).

Bibliography

References

External links
 Home page

1965 births
Living people
American computer scientists
Columbia University faculty
Columbia School of Engineering and Applied Science faculty
Massachusetts Institute of Technology School of Science alumni
Princeton University alumni
Computer science educators
People from Tenafly, New Jersey